Mascames, also spelled Maskames (Old Persian: Maškāma) was a Persian official and military commander, who flourished during the reign of Xerxes I (486–465). He was the son of Megadostes, and was appointed governor of Doriscus in 480 BC by Xerxes I, succeeding the governor who had been appointed by Darius the Great (522–486 BC). According to Herodotus, Mascames resisted all Greek attacks following the Second Persian invasion of Greece, and remained thus known as the only remaining Persian governor in Europe. Though the Greeks managed to clear other Persian garrisons in Europe, such as Eion, they were unable to take Doriscus from Mascames, which irked the Athenian military.

As no one managed to dislodge him, Mascames was highly honored by Xerxes I and received annual gifts from him for his bravery. Mascames's descendants (who succeeded him) continued to receive gifts from Xerxes I's successor, Artaxerxes I (465–424 BC). 

According to Raphael Sealey, the Achaemenid ruler probably recalled Mascames with his garrison around 465 BC, and finally abandoned Doriscus. However, Muhammad Dandamayev notes that when Herodotus wrote his Histories in the second half of the fifth century BC, Doriscus was still held by the Persians.

Miroslav Ivanov Vasilev states that Mascames may have died by 465 BC.

Notes

References

Sources
 
 
 
 

5th-century BC deaths
5th-century BC Iranian people
Persian people of the Greco-Persian Wars
Military leaders of the Achaemenid Empire
Xerxes I
Achaemenid officials
Achaemenid Thrace
465 deaths